Autoroute 640 (or A-640) is a Quebec autoroute that runs across the North Shore Region (paralleling the Rivière des Mille-Îles) from Route 344 in the Oka area to Route 138, where it ends as a four-lane expressway in Charlemagne. The road was designed to be northern bypass of the city of Montréal and was originally intended to cross the Lake of Two Mountains to connect to Autoroute 40 near Vaudreuil.

A-640 begins at Chemin d'Oka (Route 344) at a traffic circle near Oka National Park, and terminates at a signalized at-grade intersection with Rue Émile-Despins (Route 344) in Charlemagne.

History
A-640 was built over the following timeline:

From Boul. des Promenades to A-15/TCH: 1961 
From Route 337 to A-40: 1972 
From A-15/TCH to Route 337: 1974 
From Route 344 to Boul. des Promenades: 1976

Exit list

References

External links

 Steve Anderson's MontrealRoads.com: North Belt Autoroute (A-640)
 Transport Quebec
 Transports Quebec Map 
 A-640 at motorways-exits.com

40-6
Transport in Terrebonne, Quebec